Prodaná nevěsta  is a 1975 Czechoslovak film starring Josef Kemr. It is based on the comic opera The Bartered Bride by Bedřich Smetana.

References

External links
 

1975 films
Czechoslovak musical comedy films
1970s Czech-language films
Czech musical comedy films
Films based on operas
Opera films
1970s Czech films